Parnassius patricius is a high altitude butterfly that is found in Kyrgyzstan and Turkmenistan (Turkestan in older literature). It is a member of the snow Apollo genus (Parnassius) of the swallowtail family, Papilionidae. The larva feeds on Cysticorydalis fedtschenkoana.

Description 
Similar to Parnassius delphius but the submarginal spots of the hindwing upperside, when present, are paler and not centred with blue. The forewing spots usually have a less well-developed pigmentation and the sphragis is smaller than in P. delphius.

Subspecies 
 Parnassius patricius kardakoffi Bryk & Eisner, 1930
 Parnassius patricius luedwigi Kreuzberg, 1989
 Parnassius patricius lukhtanovi Rose, 1992
 Parnassius patricius priamus Bryk, 1914
 Parnassius patricius uzungyrus D. Weiss, 1979

Further reading 
sv:Parnassius patricius – Swedish Wikipedia provides further references and synonymy

External links 
Russian Insects
Funet Taxonomy, distribution

patricius
Butterflies described in 1850